Armand Émile Nicolas Massard (1 December 1884 – 8 April 1971) was a French épée fencer who competed at the 1920, 1924 and 1928 Summer Olympics. In 1920 he won an individual gold and team bronze medal, and in 1928 he earned a team silver medal.

Massard was a journalist and the editor-in-chief of La Presse, La Liberté and Le Figaro. He was president of the French Fencing Federation and of the Comité National Olympique et Sportif Français from 1933 to 1967. In 1946 he became a member of the International Olympic Committee (IOC), and in 1969 its honorary member; he served as the IOC Executive Board Member in 1950–51 and 1956–57, and as Vice-President in 1952–55. Massard was also Vice-President of the Municipal Council of Paris.

Olympic events
 1920 Summer Olympics in Antwerp
 Fencing – Épée, individual – Gold medal
 Fencing – Épée, team – Bronze medal
 1924 Summer Olympics in Paris
 Fencing – Épée, individual
 1928 Summer Olympics in Amsterdam
 Fencing – Épée, individual
 Fencing – Épée, team – Silver medal

References

External links
 

1884 births
1971 deaths
Fencers from Paris
French male épée fencers
Olympic fencers of France
Olympic gold medalists for France
Olympic silver medalists for France
Olympic bronze medalists for France
Olympic medalists in fencing
Medalists at the 1920 Summer Olympics
Medalists at the 1928 Summer Olympics
Fencers at the 1920 Summer Olympics
Fencers at the 1924 Summer Olympics
Fencers at the 1928 Summer Olympics